Pennie is the health insurance marketplace for the U.S. state of Pennsylvania.

Pennie may also refer to the following persons:

 Alex Pennie (born 1985), British musician
 Aloysius Pennie (born 1984), Liberian footballer 
 Chris Pennie (born 1977), American drummer
 Collins Pennie (born 1985), American actor
 Fiona Pennie (born 1982), British slalom canoeist
 Ken Pennie (born 1949), Canadian Air Force general
 Terje Pennie (born 1960), Estonian actress